Serang Jaya Football Club (simply known as SJFC or Serang Jaya) is an Indonesian football club based in Serang, Banten. They currently compete in the Liga 3 and their homeground is Maulana Yusuf Stadium.

References

External links

Serang
Sport in Banten
Football clubs in Indonesia
Football clubs in Banten